The 2022 European 10,000m Cup took place on 28 May 2022 in Pacé, France.

Medallists

Results

Men's

Women's

References

External links
Men's individual results
Men's team results
Women's individual results
Women's team results

European Cup 10,000m
European Cup 10,000m
Athletics in France
European 10,000m Cup
European 10,000m Cup